Alaafin, or The Owner of the Palace in the Yoruba language, is the title of the emperor of the medieval Oyo empire and present-day Oyo town of West Africa. He ruled the old Oyo Empire which extended from the present day Benin republic to Nigeria originating from states in the South East and West to the North. The people under him are called Yoruba people and spoke the Yoruba Language.

The Alaafin of Oyo in Yoruba mythology and history is said to be one of Oduduwa seven grandsons who later became Kings, forming the bedrock of the Yoruba Civilization[1] . 

The title was retained after the fall of the Oyo Empire as the official title of the ceremonial ruler of the contemporary natives of Oyo, Nigeria. The Alaafin is the political head of the Yoruba people and the only monarch with the pre-requisite power to appoint a chieftain representing the entire Yorubaland. Examples of such appointments include Aare Ona Kakanfo of Yorubaland and Iyalode of Yorubaland.

 the Alaafin (Emperor) of Oyo was Oba Lamidi Adeyemi III who was the 45th Alaafin, celebrated his 50th year on the throne. Oba Lamidi Olayiwola Adeyemi III, Iku Baba Yeye, Alaafin (Emperor) of Oyo was the permanent Chairman, Oyo State Council of Obas and Chiefs until his death on Friday, 22 April 2022. The style used for Alaafins is Imperial Majesty.

See also
Rulers of the Yoruba state of Oyo

References 
4. The official website of the Alaafin of Oyo (https://www.alaafinoyo.com )

5. A Symbol of Yoruba Culture and Unity: The Life and Royalty of His Imperial Majesty, Oba Adeyemi III, the Alaafin Oyo by Siyan Oyeweso and Olutayo C. Adesina

 
Yoruba royal titles